Trouble in Paradise is a 1980 album by Deborah Allen and released by Capitol Records. This was Allen's first studio album.

Track listing

Personnel
Deborah Allen - lead vocals
Steve Gibson - electric guitar, acoustic guitar, sitar
Rafe Van Hoy - electric guitar, acoustic guitar
Paul Worley - electric guitar
Leland Sklar - bass guitar
Byrd Burton - steel guitar
Bobby Ogdin - piano, organ
Mitch Humphries - piano
Eddie Bayers - drums, percussion
Bill Jones - saxophone
Sheldon Kurland Strings - strings
Technical
Marshall Morgan - recording, mixing
Eric Wrobbel - art direction
Wood Newton - cover photography

Track information and credits taken from the album's liner notes.

References

External links
Deborah Allen Official Site
Capitol Records Official Site

1980 debut albums
Capitol Records albums
Deborah Allen albums